Bob Mitchell may refer to:

Sports
 Bob Mitchell (American football) (1922–1997), American football player
 Bob Mitchell (baseball) (1932–2019), American baseball player
 Bob Mitchell (footballer), Scottish footballer
 Bob Mitchell (rugby league), New Zealand rugby league player
 Bob Mitchell (weightlifter), American weightlifter

Others
 Bob Mitchell (British politician) (1927–2003), British Labour (and then SDP) Member of Parliament for Southampton Itchen and Southampton Test
 Bob Mitchell (Saskatchewan politician) (1936–2016), lawyer and political figure in Saskatchewan, Canada
 Bob Mitchell (screenwriter) (1918–1992), American screenwriter
 Bob Mitchell (Ontario politician) (1931-2007), MPP and Ontario Cabinet Minister

See also
Bobby Mitchell (disambiguation)
Robert Mitchell (disambiguation)